Georges Achille-Fould or George-Achille Fould-Stirbey (24 August 1868 – 24 August 1951) was a French painter.

Achille-Fould was born in Asnières-sur-Seine as the daughter of the actress Josephine Wilhelmine Valérie Simonin, better known under her pseudonym Gustave Haller, and politician Gustave-Eugène Fould (one of the Fould family bankers). She was adopted along with her sister, the painter Consuelo Fould, by the Prince Stirbey. Her painting Courtship was included in the 1905 book Women Painters of the World. Her work was also part of the painting event in the art competition at the 1924 Summer Olympics.

Achille-Fould died in Brussels.

References

Georges Achille-Fould on artnet

1868 births
1951 deaths
People from Asnières-sur-Seine
19th-century French painters
French people of Jewish descent
French women painters
19th-century French women artists
20th-century French painters
20th-century French women artists
Olympic competitors in art competitions
Fould family